Bring Back... is a British television series comprising one-off shows where Justin Lee Collins tries to locate people from music, TV, or film backgrounds to reunite them for a one-off performance or get-together. The series was broadcast on Channel 4.

Bring Back... Grange Hill
Transmitted: 10 May 2005

Collins looks back at the successful television series Grange Hill and in particular its anti-drugs campaign in 1986 which led to the production of the pop record "Just Say No". He tries to track down the original actors in the show at the time and reunite them for a one-off performance of the song. Justin has a problem in that he has just 10 days to trace them, but many have abandoned their acting careers altogether and are reluctant to relive their brush with adolescent stardom. However, he did manage to track down and interview:

Alison Bettles - Fay Lucas
George Christopher - Ziggy Greaves
Mmoloki Chrystie - Kevin Baylon
Lee MacDonald - Zammo McGuire
Erkan Mustafa - Roland Browning

Only Bettles, MacDonald, Christopher and Mustafa arrived to sing their 80s hit at the Hammersmith Palais, but they were joined on stage by other former cast members who were not interviewed, among them was Mark Savage who played 'Gripper' Stebson.

Despite the title, Grange Hill was still airing at the time the show aired. On 15 September 2008 Grange Hill finally came to an end after 30 years.

Bring Back... The Christmas Number One
Transmitted: 10 December 2005

Collins attempts to make a Christmas-themed song to the Christmas number one single slot - a feat not accomplished since Cliff Richard's "Saviour's Day" in 1990, excluding the re-recorded version of the 1984 song "Do They Know It's Christmas?" by Band Aid 20 in 2004.

In the end, they produced the song "I'm Goin' Home", featuring the following musicians:

 David Essex (vocals)
 Mud's Rob Davis (guitar)
 Slade's Dave Hill (guitar)
 Slade's Don Powell (drums)
 Jona Lewie (piano)
 Mud's Dave Mount (drums)
 Showaddywaddy (backing vocals)
 Justin Lee Collins (backing vocals and sleigh bells)

Liz Mitchell of Boney M and Aled Jones expressed interest in the project, but were ultimately unable to attend.

The song was to be released so it could compete to be Christmas number 1 but the record company axed the release. However it was available for download from the Channel 4 website where it reached number 1 in the site's download chart.

Bring Back... The A-Team
Transmitted: 18 May 2006

Justin attempts to re-unite the cast of his favourite show as a child, The A-Team. He has to secure interviews and appearances with the stars of the show who have not spoken to each other for some time. Justin met with the below people to discuss the show and asked them to attend a reunion. All but Mr. T made it to the meeting, which took place at the Friars Club of Beverly Hills.

Dirk Benedict - Templeton "Faceman" Peck
Dwight Schultz - H.M. "Howling Mad" Murdock
Marla Heasley - Tawnia Baker
Jack Ging - General Harlan "Bull" Fullbright 
Mr. T - B.A. Baracus
Stephen Cannell - series co-creator

The below people, although not interviewed by Justin, appeared at the meeting.
William Lucking - Colonel Lynch
Lance LeGault - Colonel Roderick Decker
Christian Peppard - Representing his late father George Peppard

Justin uses unorthodox methods, such as ambushing the actors in their homes, hotel rooms, or even while out shopping, without any prior warning and, for Mr. T, attempting to gatecrash his way into the Latin Grammy Awards.

During every interview, Collins would inquire about the rumored tension between Peppard and Mr T. Although Peppard was an established star of Hollywood movies, Mr. T was relatively new to on-screen acting yet, in a short time, he was generally regarded as the main star of the show. It was suggested that tension did indeed exist between the two and was most probably due to Peppard's bitterness of Mr. T's status in the show. During the interview with Mr. T, the trademark gold chains worn by his character were discussed. Mr. T stated that they were symbolic of the iron chains of his African slave-ancestors but made from gold because he thinks of himself as being a 'slave' except with a higher price now. As a joke, a medium attempted to contact the deceased George Peppard via seance.

The episode excludes any mention of the fifth season, and actors Eddie Velez and Robert Vaughn, who had joined the cast for that season only, were likewise not interviewed. Instead, the finale of the fourth season, in which Jack Ging's character (General Fullbright) is shot and killed, is referred to as the series' final episode.

Bring Back... One Hit Wonders
Transmitted: 9 June 2006

Collins attempts to reunite former pop artists from past decades who have only had one big, well known hit, to play at a one-off gig. He interviewed:

Joe Dolce
Renato Pagliari of the duo Renée and Renato
Clive Jackson of Doctor and the Medics
Carl Douglas
Mary Sandeman aka Aneka

Only Pagliari, Jackson and Douglas turned up to perform their hits at the Clapham Grand, London.

Bring Back... Dallas
Transmitted: 27 May 2007

Collins tries to track down the retired stars of Dallas and reunite them at his Oil Barons Ball. Only Eric Farlow, the first actor to play Baby Christopher in the show, arrived, much to Collins' delight. By the end of the show he managed to find and interview

Mary Crosby - Kristin Shepard
Patrick Duffy - Bobby Ewing
Linda Gray - Sue Ellen Ewing
Larry Hagman - J.R. Ewing
Susan Howard - Donna Culver Krebbs
Ken Kercheval - Cliff Barnes
Charlene Tilton - Lucy Ewing
Eric Farlow - Baby Christopher (not originally interviewed)

Dallas was revived in 2012; the new version would be produced until 2014.

Bring Back... Star Wars
Transmitted: 14 September 2008

Collins attempts to reunite the stars of the original Star Wars trilogy. He was unable to secure a meeting with Harrison Ford (Han Solo). He was offered an interview with Mark Hamill (Luke Skywalker) for $50,000; after raising several thousand dollars, Collins was unable to negotiate the price any lower, and was forced to abandon any hopes of meeting Hamill. Collins did, however, succeed in securing interviews, through a combination of deception and surprise attacks, with the following:

Carrie Fisher - Princess Leia
Anthony Daniels - C-3PO
Kenny Baker - R2-D2
Peter Mayhew - Chewbacca
Jeremy Bulloch - Boba Fett
David Prowse - Darth Vader
Billy Dee Williams - Lando Calrissian
Warwick Davis - Wicket

Of these, only Bulloch, Davis, Baker and Prowse were able to attend the reunion in London. Daniels called to say he could not attend. Fisher recorded a humorous video message to be played as a holographic message, akin to the one in the original Star Wars film. Mayhew and Williams also made short video clips to be played similarly, albeit without audio. Justin had a lightsaber battle with Davis in which Davis was the victor.

Bring Back... Fame

Transmitted: 27 December 2008

Lee Collins attempts to reunite the cast of the vintage television show. He travels to America to track down some of the surviving members of the hit movie and spin-off TV show, Fame.  He successfully tracked down:

Irene Cara - Coco Hernandez (film)
Erica Gimpel - Coco Hernandez (TV)
Carlo Imperato - Danny Amatullo
Valerie Landsburg - Doris Schwartz
Lee Curreri - Bruno Martelli
Carol Mayo Jenkins - Elizabeth Sherwood
Debbie Allen - Lydia Grant

Of those, Gimpel, Imperato, Landsburg, Curreri, Jenkins and Allen turned up for the street dance reunion that was arranged by Lee Collins.  During the show he also talks to the mother of Gene Anthony Ray who played "Leroy" in both the film and television series. Ray had died in 2003 from a stroke.

Bring Back... Star Trek

Transmitted: 9 May 2009

Collins attempts to track down the cast of the original Star Trek series (except for DeForest Kelley, who died in 1999, and James Doohan, who died in 2005), hoping to recreate the scene from the episode "Arena" in which Captain Kirk battles a Gorn. Despite his best efforts he was unable to interview William Shatner. None of the cast attended the planned reunion, but he was able to create a scene on his own bridge of the USS Collins, JLC-1702, using footage filmed during interviews with Takei, Nichols and Koenig. Bobby Clark put on a version of the Gorn outfit in order to recreate the battle scene with Collins standing in for Shatner. He succeeded in tracking down:

George Takei - Hikaru Sulu
Grace Lee Whitney - Janice Rand
Nichelle Nichols - Nyota Uhura
Walter Koenig - Pavel Chekov
Eddie Paskey - Lieutenant Leslie
Bobby Clark - Gorn
Leonard Nimoy - Spock

Bring Back... The Goonies
Collins had intended to reunite the cast of the 1985 film The Goonies, however, owing to poor ratings for Bring Back...Star Trek, Channel 4 cancelled the series.

References

2005 British television series debuts
2009 British television series endings
Channel 4 original programming
Television series by ITV Studios